Danijel Vušković (born 5 January 1981) is a retired Croatian footballer, currently a youth team coach at HNK Hajduk Split. He is father of Mario Vušković, Hajduk player as well.

External links
 
  Player page on the official Luch-Energiya website
 

1981 births
Living people
Footballers from Deventer
Dutch people of Croatian descent
Association football central defenders
Dutch footballers
Croatian footballers
Croatia youth international footballers
HNK Hajduk Split players
NK Solin players
HNK Šibenik players
HNK Rijeka players
NK Zadar players
FC Luch Vladivostok players
NK Dugopolje players
NK Hrvace players
NK Uskok players
Croatian Football League players
Russian Premier League players
Croatian expatriate footballers
Expatriate footballers in Russia
Croatian expatriate sportspeople in Russia